David Paradine Productions is a television production company founded by David Frost as 'David Paradine Ltd' in 1966. "Paradine" was Frost's middle name.

Notable productions
 At Last the 1948 Show (1967–68) Rediffusion London
 The Rise and Rise of Michael Rimmer (1970) Warner Bros.-Seven Arts
 Through the Keyhole (1987-2008) Yorkshire Television (although the concept originated during Frost's period with TV-am)

Productions
 Frost on Sketch Shows (2013) 
 Frost on Interviews (2012) 
 Frost on Satire (2010) 
 The Frost Report Is Back (2008) 
 Frost Over the World (2006) 
 Frost Tonight (2006) 
 Inside Elton's World (2005) 
 Spitting Image: Down and Out in the White House (1986) 
 David Frost Interviews Richard Nixon (1977) 
 Crossroads of Civilization: The Story of Iran (1977)
 The Slipper and the Rose (1976)
 Leadbelly (1976) 
 David Frost Presents the Guinness Book of World Records (1975) 
 Who Killed Lamb? (1974) 
 Charley One-Eye (1973) 
 Rentadick (1972) 
 Futtocks End (1970) 
 David Frost Presents: Frankie Howerd (1969) 
 David Frost Presents: How to Irritate People (1969)

References

Television production companies of the United Kingdom